Animal Health was a UK government executive agency primarily responsible for ensuring that farmed animals in Great Britain were healthy, disease-free and well looked after.

One of its key roles was to implement government policies aimed at preventing - or managing - outbreaks of serious animal diseases, and in doing so support the farming industry, protect the welfare of farmed animals and safeguard public health from animal borne disease.

In England and Wales it also worked to protect public health by ensuring that dairy hygiene and egg production standards were met.

It also regulated the trade in endangered species through CITES.

Previously Animal Health was known as State Veterinary Service.

The Scottish arm of the organisation was a member of SEARS (Scotland's Environmental and Rural Services).

On 1 April 2011 it merged with the Veterinary Laboratories Agency to form the Animal Health and Veterinary Laboratories Agency.

See also
 Veterinary medicine
 National Office of Animal Health

References

External links
Official website

Defunct executive agencies of the United Kingdom government
Agricultural organisations based in the United Kingdom
Veterinary organizations
Veterinary medicine in the United Kingdom